Cecil Nascimento (13 September 1903 – 16 March 1952) was a Guyanese cricketer. He played in ten first-class matches for British Guiana from 1923 to 1930.

See also
 List of Guyanese representative cricketers

References

External links
 

1903 births
1952 deaths
Guyanese cricketers
Guyana cricketers